KEXS (1090 AM) is a radio station licensed to Excelsior Springs, Missouri, and serving the Kansas City metropolitan area.  The station is owned by the Catholic Radio Network, and airs a Roman Catholic religious radio format.  The call letters stand for its city of license, EXcelsior Springs.  To support the station, KEXS periodically holds on-air pledge drives.

KEXS broadcasts at 10,000 watts by day.  But because AM 1090 is a clear-channel frequency, reserved for Class A stations KAAY Little Rock, WBAL Baltimore and XEPRS Rosarito-Tijuana, the station must reduce power to 4,000 watts during critical hours and sign-off at night, to avoid interference.  Programming is simulcast on sister station 890 KMVG and on FM translator K225CI at 92.9 MHz.  The Catholic Radio Network also owns 1190 KDMR in Kansas City, which airs Spanish-language Catholic programming.

History
In August 1968, KEXS first signed on the air as a daytime-only station.  It broadcast at just 250 watts in its early years and served as a community-based radio station for Excelsior Springs, playing country music and airing local news.  In recent decades, the station played Southern Gospel music.

See also
 KXJJ

References

External links

 
 

EXS
EXS
Catholic radio stations
Radio stations established in 1968
1968 establishments in Missouri
EXS (AM)